Holcoceroides is a genus of moths in the family Blastobasidae. It contains only one species, Holcoceroides scythrella, which is found in Russia.

References

Blastobasidae
Controversial taxa